Prorophora halothamni is a species of snout moth described by Mark I. Falkovitsh in 1999. It is found in Uzbekistan.

References

Phycitinae
Moths described in 1999